Almost all mammal penises have foreskins or prepuce, although in non-human cases the foreskin is usually a sheath (sometimes called the preputial sheath, praeputium or penile sheath) into which the whole penis is retracted. In koalas, the foreskin contains naturally occurring bacteria that play an important role in fertilization. In some bat species, the prepuce contains an erectile tissue structure called the accessory corpus cavernosus.

During musth, a male elephant may urinate with the penis still in the sheath, which causes the urine to spray on the hind legs.

Male dogs have a conspicuous penis sheath.

In stallions, the retractor penis muscle contracts to retract the stallion's penis into the sheath and relaxes to allow the penis to extend from the sheath.

The penis sheath of a male axis deer is elongated and urine-stained. When rubbing trees with their horns, these stags sometimes move the penis back and forth rapidly inside its sheath. Male bison and fallow deer have tufts of fur at the end of their penis sheaths.

In rodents, the length of the prepuce is related to urine marking behavior.

See also 

Horse sheath cleaning
Preputial glands, glands which are found in the prepuce of some male mammals

References

Further reading

Penis